Basil William Peacey (1889–1969) was the fourth Bishop of Lebombo from 1929 until 1935.

He was educated at Christ's Hospital and Leeds University. After a period of study at the College of the Resurrection, Mirfield, Peacey was ordained in 1912. His first post was as a Curate in Hull. Then he emigrated to South Africa to be Priest-Vicar  of the Grahamstown Cathedral. His next post was as Priest in charge of Pessene in Maputoland followed by Principal of St Christopher's College Hlamankulu, where he was later appointed to the episcopate. Peacey next served as Rector of Krugersdorp and then Constantia before he retired in 1954.

References

1889 births
People educated at Christ's Hospital
Alumni of the University of Leeds
Alumni of the College of the Resurrection
Anglican bishops of Lebombo
1969 deaths
20th-century Anglican Church of Southern Africa bishops